Daniela Andrea Pardo Moreno (born 9 May 1988) is a Chilean footballer who plays as a midfielder for Santiago Morning and the Chile women's national team.

International career
Pardo represented Chile at two South American U-20 Women's Championship editions (2006 and 2008) and the 2008 FIFA U-20 Women's World Cup. She made her senior debut during the 2006 South American Women's Football Championship on 10 November that year.

References 

1988 births
Living people
Footballers from Santiago
Chilean women's footballers
Women's association football midfielders
Unión Española footballers
Everton de Viña del Mar footballers
Santiago Morning (women) footballers
Unión La Calera footballers
Chile women's international footballers
2019 FIFA Women's World Cup players
Footballers at the 2020 Summer Olympics
Olympic footballers of Chile